Partulina dubia is a species of tropical air-breathing land snail, a terrestrial pulmonate gastropod mollusk in the family Achatinellidae. This species is endemic to Hawaii, in the United States.

References 

Molluscs of Hawaii
Partulina
Taxonomy articles created by Polbot